Soldier's Fantasy (Italian: Fantasia 'e surdate) is a 1927 Italian silent film directed by Elvira Notari and starring Geppino Jovine, Eduardo Notari and Oreste Tesorone. It is preserved in the National Film Archive of Rome.

Cast
 Geppino Jovine as Gigi
 Eduardo Notari as Gennariello
 Oreste Tesorone 
 Lina Ciprani

References

Bibliography
 Bruno, Giuliana. Streetwalking on a Ruined Map: Cultural Theory and the City Films of Elvira Notari. Princeton University Press, 1993.

External links 
 

1927 films
Italian silent short films
1920s Italian-language films
Films directed by Elvira Notari
Italian black-and-white films
1927 short films